Kadnonaga (written:  or ) is a Japanese surname. Notable people with the surname include:

James Kadonaga, American biologist
, Japanese sculptor
, Japanese swimmer

Japanese-language surnames